"Fallin" is the debut single of American singer-songwriter Alicia Keys from her debut studio album, Songs in A Minor (2001). Written and produced by Keys, "Fallin'" is generally considered her signature song. It was released as the lead single from Songs in A Minor on April 10, 2001, by J Records. The official remix features rappers Busta Rhymes and Rampage.

"Fallin'" attained global commercial success, reaching number one on the US Billboard Hot 100 and the top 10 in several countries, topping the charts of Flanders, the Netherlands, and New Zealand. In 2009, "Fallin'" was named the 29th most successful song of the 2000s, on the Billboard Hot 100 Songs of the Decade. Critically acclaimed, it won three Grammy Awards in 2002, including Song of the Year, Best R&B Song, and Best Female R&B Vocal Performance, and was also nominated for Record of the Year.

Music and lyrics
"Fallin'" was written and produced solely by Keys. When asked about the lyrical background for the song, Keys told Billboard: "I wanted to write a song for someone who was 10 or 12 years old – like a young Michael Jackson. Even though he was young, he was singing some deep stuff back then. [The song] is about the ins and outs of a relationship. Sometimes, you're completely head-over-heels in love with someone, and sometimes you can't stand that person. You fall in and out, sometimes it goes back and forth, and that's just what relationships are about."

According to the sheet music published at Musicnotes.com by Sony/ATV Music Publishing, "Fallin'" is set in 12/8 time with a "free" tempo of 60 beats per minute. It is composed in the key of E minor, with Keys' vocal range spanning from the low-note of B3 to the high-note of E5. The song has a basic chord progression of Em–Bm7–Em–Bm7 as it follows a "moderate blues tempo" throughout the chorus of the song.

Critical reception

NME called "Fallin'" a "[m]assive, massive massive hit" adding "Piano tinkles, drum machine coughs like an  whippet and Alicia strokes your spine with ice cubes and spatters your spotty back with hot candle wax". The song was described as "gospel fervor of lovesick righteousness" by Beth Johnson of Entertainment Weekly. Robert Hilburn of the Los Angeles Times described the song as having "the neo-soul vitality of Macy Gray and Jill Scott." Sam Faulkner of NME said that the song had "deeper moments [that] creep up and grab you exemplified." Mark Anthony Neal of PopMatters said that the song "combines Keys' natural blues register with a subtle, and brilliantly so, sample of James Brown's 'It's a Man's, Man's, Man's World'." Barry Walters of Rolling Stone said "there's no denying the serious early Aretha vibe permeating the hit."

Sal Cinquemani of Slant Magazine said that "the gospel-tinged [song] starts out simply with measured piano and basic drum programming, eventually building to a crescendo of operatic proportions." Steve Jones of USA Today described the song as "a bluesy ode to self-destructive love" and further commented that the song "is only a teaser for what she has to offer." Simon Price of The Independent called the song Keys' breakthrough song and noted how the melody of the song is similar to Queen's "We Are the Champions". Stephen Thomas Erlewine of AllMusic pointed out the lack of depth in the song, saying it "doesn't have much body to it", which he felt was "a testament to Keys' skills as a musician."

Accolades
One of the most critically acclaimed singles of 2001, "Fallin'" was nominated for numerous awards. It connected well with National Academy of Recording Arts and Sciences (NARAS) and was nominated for four Grammy Awards at the 44th ceremony (2002): Song of the Year, Record of the Year, Best Female R&B Vocal Performance, and Best R&B Song. It ended up winning all but one of the four awards, as Record of the Year was awarded to U2's "Walk On". At the 2001 Billboard Music Awards, "Fallin'" was nominated for the Hot 100 Single of the Year; however, it lost the award to Lifehouse's "Hanging by a Moment". The song was also nominated for Outstanding Song and Outstanding Music Video at the 2002 NAACP Image Awards; it did not win in either category.

On The Village Voices 2001 Pazz & Jop critics' poll, "Fallin'" appeared at number four. In September 2011, "Fallin'" was placed at number 22 by VH1 on its list "100 Greatest Songs of the '00s". "[G]ospel vibe and powerful vocals form Keys" led Complex to place the song on number two on its list "The 25 Best Alicia Keys Songs". The Telegraph compiled a list of "100 songs that defined the Noughties" and placed "Fallin'" at number 97. In December 2009, Rolling Stone ranked it at number 62 on their list "100 Best Songs of the Decade". "Fallin'" placed at number 413 on Blender magazine's "500 Greatest Songs Since You Were Born". In 2011, the song was ranked at number five on Nerve's list "The 25 Greatest Love Songs of the 2000s".

Commercial performance
In the United States, "Fallin'" debuted at number 98 on the Billboard Hot 100 for the week of June 16, 2001. The song peaked atop the chart in its tenth week. It remained on the chart for a total of 34 weeks and managed to chart on the 2001 Billboard Year-End Hot 100 at number two, behind Lifehouse's "Hanging by a Moment"; however, it was the highest-charting number-one single on the chart in 2001.

Music video
The accompanying music video for "Fallin'" was directed by Chris Robinson. The video opens with a radio playing "Girlfriend", where Keys is sitting at a piano. The plot has Keys traveling to a prison to visit her incarcerated boyfriend. The plot is continued in the video for Keys' next single "A Woman's Worth", which explores what happens when Keys' boyfriend is released and, with her help, adjusts back to regular life. Keys said in an interview that originally, she was supposed to be the one incarcerated, and her boyfriend was visiting her.

Track listings and formats

 US 12-inch vinyl (remix)
A1. "Fallin'" (remix) (featuring Busta Rhymes and Rampage) – 4:15
A2. "Fallin'" (remix) (instrumental version) – 4:15
B1. "Fallin'" (remix) (without rap) – 3:35
B2. "Fallin'" (radio version) – 3:16

 UK CD single
 "Fallin'" (radio version) – 3:16
 "Fallin'" (remix) (featuring Busta Rhymes and Rampage) – 4:15
 "Rear View Mirror" – 4:03
 "Fallin'" (video/picture gallery/lyrics)

 UK 12-inch single
A1. "Fallin'" (remix) (featuring Busta Rhymes and Rampage) – 4:15
B1. "Fallin'" (album version) – 3:30
B2. "Fallin'" (instrumental) – 3:06

 UK cassette single
 "Fallin'" (radio version) – 3:16
 "Fallin'" (remix) (featuring Busta Rhymes and Rampage) – 4:15
 "Rear View Mirror" – 4:03

 European CD single
 "Fallin'" – 3:30
 "Fallin'" (extended remix) (featuring Busta Rhymes and Rampage) – 4:15

 European CD maxi-single
 "Fallin'" (radio edit) – 3:16
 "Fallin'" (album version) – 3:30
 "Fallin'" (extended remix) (featuring Busta Rhymes and Rampage) – 4:15
 "Fallin'" (Remix) (without rap) – 3:35
 "Fallin'" (remix instrumental) – 4:15
 "Fallin'" (video)

 Australian and New Zealand CD maxi-single
 "Fallin'" (radio edit) – 3:16
 "Fallin'" (album version) – 3:30
 "Fallin'" (extended remix) (featuring Busta Rhymes and Rampage) – 4:15
 "Fallin'" (remix) (without rap) – 3:35
 "Fallin'" (remix instrumental) – 4:15

Credits and personnel
Credits adapted from the liner notes of Songs in A Minor.

Alicia Keys – lead vocals, backing vocals, all other instruments, producer, arranger
Miri Ben-Ari – violin
Kerry "Krucial" Brothers – drum programming
Spaceman Patterson – guitar

Cindy Mizelle – backing vocals
Tammy Saunders – backing vocals
Andricka Hall – backing vocals
Russ Elevado – mixer

Charts

Weekly charts

Year-end charts

Decade-end charts

All-time charts

Certifications

Release history

See also
 Ultratop 50 number-one hits of 2001
 Dutch Top 40 number-one hits of 2001
 List of number-one singles in 2001 (New Zealand)
 List of Hot 100 number-one singles of 2001 (U.S.)
 List of number-one R&B singles of 2001 (U.S.)
 List of Billboard Mainstream Top 40 number-one songs of 2001
 List of Hot 100 Airplay number-one singles of 2001 (U.S.)
 List of top 10 singles in 2001 (UK)
 List of best-selling singles of 2001 (Germany)
 Billboard Year-End Hot 100 singles of 2001

References

External links
 

2001 debut singles
2001 songs
2000s ballads
Alicia Keys songs
Billboard Hot 100 number-one singles
Contemporary R&B ballads
Dutch Top 40 number-one singles
Grammy Award for Song of the Year
J Records singles
Music videos directed by Chris Robinson (director)
Number-one singles in New Zealand
Songs written by Alicia Keys
Soul ballads
Ultratop 50 Singles (Flanders) number-one singles
Song recordings produced by Alicia Keys